This is a list of suburbs in the Ethekwini Metropolitan Municipality which includes the city of Durban and surrounding towns. Some of these are commonly used names for regions, collections of suburbs (e.g. Berea, Overport), or formerly independent towns that are themselves composed of suburbs (e.g. Westville) and do not necessarily correspond to specific legal townships, or suburbs.

North

Desainager
eMdloti
Genazzano 
La Lucia 
La Mercy
Mount Edgecombe 
Mount Moreland
oThongathi
Tongaat Beach 
uMhlanga
Verulam 
Westbrook
Umhlanga

Central

Arena Park
Berea
Bluff
Cato Manor
Durban North 
Essenwood
Glen Park
Glenwood
Greyville
Hillary
Inanda
Jacobs Ladder
KwaMashu
Manor Gardens
Mayville
Memorial Park
Merebank
Merewent
Mobeni
Montclair
Mount Vernon
Northdene
North Park
Ntuzuma
Overport
Phoenix 
Poet's Corner
Prospecton
Rossburgh
Springfield
Stamford Hill 
Sydenham 
Treasure Beach
Wentworth
Umhlatuzana
Umlazi
Umbilo
Windermere 
Woodhaven
Woodlands
Yellowwood Park

South

Amahlongwa
Amandawe
Amanzimtoti
Athlone Park 
Breamar 
Clansthal  
Craigieburn   
Ilfracombe 
Illovo 
Isipingo  
Kingsburgh 
KwaMakhutha
Lovu
Magabeni
Malangeni
Reunion
Umbogintwini
Umkomaas 
Warner Beach
Widenham

Outer West

Alverstone
Assagay
Botha's Hill
Cato Ridge
Crestholm
Cliffdale
Clifton Canyon
Drummond
Everton
Emberton
Forest Hills
Fredville
Gillitts
Hammarsdale
Harrison
Hillcrest
Inchanga
Kloof
KwaXimba
Molweni
Monteseel
Mpumalanga
Peacevale
Shongweni
Summerveld
Waterfall
Winston Park
Wyebank

Inner West

Berea West
Chiltern Hills
Clermont
Cowies Hill
Dassenhoek
Klaarwater
KwaDabeka
KwaNdengezi
Escombe
Malvern
Maryvale
Marianridge
Marianhill
Moseley
Nazareth
New Germany
Pinetown
Chatsworth
Bellair
Avoca
Queensburgh
Reservoir Hills
Sarnia
Savanna Park
St Wendolins Ridge / KwaSanti
Seaview
Shallcross
Thornwood
Welbedacht
Westville

References

Durban suburbs
Suburbs
List